Claudio Pelosi (born May 29, 1966 in Cantù, Como) is an Italian football (soccer) player. As a young player he represented U.S. Cremonese, Lucchese and Derthona. In the 1992–93 season he played for Calcio Catania in Serie C1 before moving to Empoli and Frosinone. He then moved on to play for Ternana, Ascoli and Pistoiese. In the 2001–02 season, Pelosi played 23 matches and scored 7 goals with Grosseto before leaving Italy and heading to South Australia where he played for Adelaide City in the National Soccer League. After scoring many goals and becoming a huge hit with City's few but proud Italian fans, Pelosi returned to Italy's lower leagues, playing with Rovigo Calcio and Lavagnese before returning in 2006–07 to play for his home-town, Cantù, in the Eccellenza.

Honours
Ternana
Serie C2: 1996-97

External links
NSL statistics

Living people
Italian footballers
1966 births
U.S. Cremonese players
Empoli F.C. players
Adelaide City FC players
National Soccer League (Australia) players
Rovigo Calcio players
A.S.D. HSL Derthona players
Association football forwards